Slow living (Proto-Germanic: *slæwaz) is a lifestyle which encourages a slower approach to aspects of everyday life, involving completing tasks at a leisurely pace. The origins of this lifestyle are linked to the Italian slow food movement, which emphasised traditional food production techniques in response to the emerging popularity of fast food during the 1980s and 1990s. Slow living encompasses a wide variety of sub-categories such as slow money and slow cities, which are proposed as solutions to the negative environmental consequences of capitalism and consumerism in alignment with the aims of the green movement. 

The slow living movement also focuses on the idea that a fast-paced way of living is chaotic, whereas a slower pace encourages enjoyment of life, a deeper appreciation of sensory experiences, and the ability to 'live in the present moment'. However, slow living does not prevent the adoption of certain technologies such as mobile phones, the Internet, and access to goods and services.

The acronym SLOW is commonly used to summarise the aims of the slow living lifestyle. The 'S' refers to sustainable, the 'L' refers to local, involving using materials and products that are produced locally, the 'O' refers to organic, meaning avoiding products that have been genetically engineered or mass-produced, and the 'W' refers to whole, meaning not processed.

See also 

 Slow movement
 Simple living
 Downshifting (lifestyle)
 Positive psychology
 The good life
 In Praise of Slow
 Mindfulness (psychology)
 Wu-wei
 Slow media
 Cittaslow

References

Further reading 
In Praise of Slow: Challenging the Cult of Speed, Carl Honoré, 2004, HarperOne
Va Bene, Katherine Stirling, The New Yorker, April 7, 2008, Retrieved 1/20/2016

Slow movement